William Eric Ross (born 19 September 1944) is a Northern Irish former footballer who played as an inside forward or midfielder and made one appearance for the Northern Ireland national team.

Career
Ross earned his first and only cap for Northern Ireland on 10 September 1968 in a friendly against Israel. The away match, which was played in Tel Aviv, finished as a 3–2 win for Northern Ireland.

Personal life
Ross was born on 19 September 1944 in Belfast. After his retirement from football, he moved to Canada in the 1970s, where he worked as a travel agent in the Vancouver area.

Career statistics

International

References

External links
 
 

1944 births
Living people
Association footballers from Belfast
Association footballers from Northern Ireland
Northern Ireland youth international footballers
Northern Ireland international footballers
Irish League representative players
Expatriate association footballers from Northern Ireland
Expatriate sportspeople from Northern Ireland in the United States
Expatriate soccer players in the United States
Expatriate footballers in England
Association football inside forwards
Association football midfielders
Glentoran F.C. players
Detroit Cougars (soccer) players
Newcastle United F.C. players
Northampton Town F.C. players
Hartlepool United F.C. players
North Shields F.C. players
NIFL Premiership players
United Soccer Association players
English Football League players
Northern Football League players
Northern Ireland emigrants to Canada